A , or shrine maiden, is a young priestess who works at a Shinto shrine.  were once likely seen as shamans, but are understood in modern Japanese culture to be an institutionalized role in daily life, trained to perform tasks, ranging from sacred cleansing to performing the sacred  dance.

Appearance

In Shinto, the color white symbolizes purity.

 also use bells, drums, candles, and bowls of rice in ceremonies.

Definition

As time passed, they left the shrines and began working independently in secular society.

 are known by many names; Fairchild lists 26 terms for "shrine-attached " and 43 for "non-shrine-attached ".

In English, the word is often translated as "shrine maiden", though freer renderings often simply use the phrase "female shaman" or, as Lafcadio Hearn translated it, "Divineress". Some scholars prefer the transliteration , contrasting the Japanese Mikoism with other Asian terms for female shamans. As Fairchild explains:

Mikoism

History

 traditions date back to the prehistoric Jōmon period of Japan, when female shamans would go into "trances and convey the words of the gods" (the ), an act comparable with "the pythia or sibyl in Ancient Greece."

The early  were important social figures who were "associated with the ruling class". "In addition to her ritual performances of ecstatic trance", writes Kuly, "[the ] performed a variety of religious and political functions".

During the Nara period (710–794) and Heian period (794–1185), government officials tried to control  practices. As Fairchild notes:

In 780 A.D. and in 807 A.D. official bulls against the practice of ecstasy outside of the authority of the shrines were published. These bulls were not only aimed at ecstasy, but were aimed at magicians, priests, sorcerers, etc. It was an attempt to gain complete control, while at the same time it aimed at eradicating abuses which were occurring.

During the feudal Kamakura period (1185–1333) when Japan was controlled by warring  states:

[T]he  was forced into a state of mendicancy as the shrines and temples that provided her with a livelihood fell into bankruptcy. Disassociated from a religious context, her performance moved further away from a religious milieu and more toward one of a non-ecclesiastical nature.

During the Edo period (1603–1868), writes Groemer, "the organizational structures and arts practiced by female shamans in eastern Japan underwent significant transformations". Though in the Meiji period (1868–1912), many shamanistic practices were outlawed:

After 1867 the Meiji government's desire to create a form of state Shinto headed by the emperor—the shaman-in-chief of the nation—meant that Shinto needed to be segregated from both Buddhism and folk-religious beliefs. As a result, official discourse increasingly repeated negative views of Miko and their institutions.

Traditional training

The position of a shaman passed from generation to generation, but sometimes someone not directly descended from a shaman went voluntarily into training or was appointed by the village chieftains. To achieve this, such a person had to have some potential. Several characteristics could be seen as a sign a person was called towards shamanism: neurosis, hallucinations, unusual behavior and hysteria. These conditions are still referred to as shamanistic sicknesses.

An acknowledged elder shaman, who could be a family member (like an aunt) or a member of the tribe, would teach the girl in training the techniques required to be in control of her trance state. This would be done by rituals including washings with cold water, regular purifying, abstinence and the observation of the common taboos like death, illness and blood. This was achieved by chanting and dancing, thus therefore the girl was taught melodies and intonations that were used in songs, prayers and magical formulas, supported by drum and rattlers.

Other attributes used for rituals were mirrors (to attract the ) and swords (katana). She also needed the knowledge of the several names of the  that were important for her village, as well as their function. Finally she learned a secret language, only known by insiders (other shamans of the tribe) and so discovered the secrets of fortune-telling and magical formulas.

After the training, which could take three to seven years, the girl would get her initiation rite to become a real shaman. This mystic ceremony was witnessed by her mentor, other elders and fellow shamans. The girl wore a white shroud as a symbol for the end of her previous life. The elders began chanting and after a while the girl started to shiver. Next, her mentor would ask the girl which  had possessed her and therefore be the one she would serve. As soon as she answered, the mentor would throw a rice cake into her face, causing the girl to faint. The elders would bring the girl to a warm bed and keep her warm until she woke up. When the whole ordeal was over and the girl had woken up, she was permitted to wear a coloured wedding dress and perform the corresponding tradition of the wedding toast.

The resemblance of a wedding ceremony as the initiation rite suggests that the trainee, still a virgin, had become the bride of the  she served (called a ). During her trance, said  had requested the girl to his shrine. In some areas of Japan she had to bring a pot filled with rice and a pan.

Contemporary 

Kuly describes the contemporary  as: "A far distant relative of her premodern shamanic sister, she is most probably a university student collecting a modest wage in this part-time position."

The ethnologist Kunio Yanagita (1875–1962), who first studied Japanese female shamans, differentiated them into  who dance with bells and participate in  rituals,  who speak on behalf of the deceased, and  who engage in cult worship and invocations (for instance, the Tenrikyo founder Nakayama Miki).

Researchers have further categorized contemporary  in terms of their diverse traditions and practices. Others have divided miko or fujo by blindness between blind  or  who perform  and spirit mediumship and sighted  or  who perform divination and invocations.

In the eclectic Shugendō religion, priests who practiced ecstasy often married .

See also
 Babaylan, female shamans in Filipino animism
 Bhikkhunī
 Bobohizan, female shamans among the Kadazan-Dusun
  in Onarigami
  in Ryukyuan religion
 Noro (priestess)
 
 List of fictional Miko
 Nun
 Shinto

Notes

References
 Aston, William George. Shinto: way of the gods. Longmans, Green, and Co. (1905)
 Blacker, Carmen. The Catalpa Bow: A Study of Shamanistic Practices in Japan. London: George Allen & Unwin. (1975)
 Fairchild, William P. "Shamanism in Japan", Folklore Studies 21:1–122. (1962)
 Folklore Society, The. Folklore, Volume 10.Great Britain. (1899) 
 Groemer, Gerald. "Female Shamans in Eastern Japan during the Edo Period", Asian Folklore Studies 66:27–53. (2007)
 Hardacre, Helen. "Shinmeiaishinkai and the study of shamanism in contemporary Japanese life," in Religion in Japan, ed. by P.F. Kornicki and I.J. McMullen, Cambridge University Press, pp. 198–219. (1996)
 Hearn, Lafcadio. Glimpses of unfamiliar Japan: Volume 1. Houghton, Mifflin and company. (1894)
 Hori, Ichiro. Folk Religion in Japan: Continuity and Change. Chicago: Univ. of Chicago Press. (1968) .
 Kawamura Kunimitsu. "A Female Shaman's Mind and Body, and Possession", Asian Folklore Studies 62.2:257–289. (2003)
 Kuly, Lisa. "Locating Transcendence in Japanese Minzoku Geinô: Yamabushi and Miko Kagura," Ethnologies 25.1:191–208. (2003)
 North-China herald and Supreme Court & consular gazette, The: Volume 79 - North-China Herald. (1906) 
 Ricci, Daniele Japanese Shamanism: trance and possession. Volume Edizioni (Kindle Edition, 2012).
 Picken, Stuart DB. The A to Z of Shinto. Scarecrow Press. (2006)
 Waley, Arthur. The Noh Plays of Japan. (1921)

External links

 "Miko", Encyclopedia of Shinto entry

 
Articles containing video clips
Female stock characters in anime and manga
Religious occupations
Shamanism in Japan
Shinto in Japan
Japanese words and phrases